Changes is the fourteenth studio album by American country music singer Tanya Tucker. It was released on September 6, 1982, by Arista Records and would be her only album for the label. The album was produced by David Malloy and peaked at number 47 on the Billboard Top Country LPs chart. Four singles were released from the album, the most successful being the track "Feel Right" which peaked at number 10 on the Billboard Hot Country Singles chart.

Critical reception

Billboard gave a positive review of the album. The review noted Tucker's change in genre from country and rock 'n' roll to a more MOR and adult contemporary pop sound, but went on to say that her "previous influences are [still] there." They praised Tucker's vocal performance as "strong and distinct" and the productions as "subtle enough" to allow Tucker's "unique persona" to come through. The review concluded by saying that the album maintains an "endearing roughness" and "hard edge" to keep it from completely "dissolving into commercial pop."

Track listing

Chart performance

References 

1982 albums
Tanya Tucker albums
Arista Records albums
Albums produced by David Malloy